WhiteWater World is a seasonal water park situated in the suburb of Coomera on the Gold Coast, Australia. It is owned and operated by Ardent Leisure and is the sister park to Dreamworld.

After years of planning and a year of construction, WhiteWater World opened to the public on 8 December 2006. The ten Australian beach culture themed attractions cost approximately A$56 million. These included The Green Room, Super Tubes Hydrocoaster, The Rip, The BRO, Temple of Huey, Cave of Waves, Wiggle Bay, and Pipeline Plunge. Several more attractions have been added in the following years, including The Little Rippers, The Wedgie, Triple Vortex and Fully 6, with plans for a $7 million expansion commencing in 2019.

History

Development
In 2004, Macquarie Leisure began planning a water park to be located next to the company's existing Dreamworld theme park. Dreamworld's Chief Executive Officer Stephen Gregg and General Manager of Special Projects Bob Tan visited water parks around the world to discover the most thrilling and cutting-edge water rides available. Later Tan was quoted saying "...the drawing board for the new park was a restaurant napkin in a little cafe in the US".

On 28 November 2005, Macquarie Leisure announced it would invest $56 million on the Dreamworld Water Park project, with construction commencing shortly thereafter.

The existing Dreamworld car park was redesigned to accommodate more cars and the addition of a water park in the southern portion. Construction of the water park began in January 2006. In June, two of the three slide towers were complete, with several slides in the early phases of construction. One month later, several attractions were announced by the park with others being speculated upon. Some attractions were nearing completion in September and all the planned attractions had been revealed by October.

WhiteWater World opened three weeks ahead of schedule on 8 December 2006 after a week of previews. The park opened with ten attractions, including The Green Room, The Rip, Super Tubes Hydrocoaster, The BRO, The Temple of Huey (3 individual slides), Pipeline Plunge, Wiggle Bay and the Cave of Waves. At this time, the park featured many Australian and world firsts: The Rip and Super Tubes Hydrocoaster were both Australian firsts; The BRO was a world first; and The Green Room was Australia's biggest Tornado slide. After six months of operation Macquarie Leisure announced that WhiteWater World attracted 247,360 visitors, producing a revenue of $8.7 million and a profit of $4 million.

Performance

WhiteWater World performed above expectations after opening with approximately 23,000 guests between 8 December and 31 December 2006. WhiteWater World continued to exceed Macquarie Leisure's expectations during its first year of operation. The first year saw 493,227 guests, exceeding the 450,000 estimate, earning the park over $8.4 million in revenue. The park continued to perform well in subsequent years with an 18.4% increase in attendance in 2008.

In June 2009, Macquarie Leisure was renamed to Ardent Leisure as part of a corporate repositioning which saw the company split from Macquarie. In August 2010, Ardent Leisure announced a decline in revenue and profits in its theme park division. It stated that a capital expenditure plan had been endorsed which would "...strengthen ride inventory and consumer appeal".

WhiteWaterWorld is currently ranked as one of the world's most water efficient parks because of its sustainable water management and environmentally friendly technology.

Expansion
In September 2007, the park added two attractions: a pair of ProSlide Cannon Bowls called The Little Rippers and an events venue called The Shell. A month later, WhiteWater World submitted a development application to the Gold Coast City Council to extend the water park. The main feature of the application was a  tower featuring three new water slides: two Mammoth slides and a Tornado Tantrum Alley. The expansion proposal also featured a lazy river and a large water play area. After two years, the application was approved by the council. The expansion plans have been delayed due to the 2007-2010 financial crisis.

In December 2009, it was reported that WhiteWater World planned to add a WhiteWater West AquaLoop. However Village Roadshow Theme Parks, owner of competitor Wet'n'Wild Gold Coast, attempted to negotiate an exclusivity agreement with the manufacturer. Three months later in February 2010, it was announced that WhiteWater World would build an alternative attraction built by ProSlide before the April school holidays. The Wedgie, the first ProSlide Superloop, opened on 1 April 2011. It was the first ride in Australia to feature a trap door release and was marketed as Australia's first looping water slide.

In 2011, WhiteWater World's contract with Nickelodeon was terminated and Nickelodeon's Pipeline Plunge was renamed Pipeline Plunge.

Later additions
In September 2014, the park added 'Triple Vortex', a two-person tube slide by ProSlide.

In late 2018, the park announced a $15 million 'Adventure Precinct' expansion to the park which organisers described as a "tropical oasis" with a combination of features "never before seen in similar attractions around the world". At the time of announcement earth works for the expansion had already begun, however in early 2019 this construction work ceased without explanation. The site remains untouched, suggesting that the expansion has been cancelled with no explanation from the park as to why it did not go ahead.

Refurbishment
At a shareholders conference on 23 August 2019 Ardent Leisure announced a $7-million investment into WhiteWater World, featuring a new waterslide complex named 'Fully 6'. The new attraction consists of six new body slides and multi-coloured natural light effects. Construction of the slide complex, designed and manufactured by Swimplex-Polin Australia had already begun at this point with plans to open to the public in late 2019. The investment also included a full re-paint and refurbishment of the existing attractions at the park. By September 2021, all of the existing attractions (excluding Triple Vortex) were fully repainted.

Attractions
WhiteWater World features several water slide attractions (most of which are built by ProSlide), a large wave pool and separate children and toddler areas. There are food and beverage outlets, retail stores, a surf school, a function area and numerous shaded areas with seating. The park features four water slide towers, each featuring a collection of slides grouped by the level of thrill. The park also features three family-oriented water attractions separate from the towers. All of the park's attractions have an Australian beach culture theme.

The slide tower near the entrance contains the park's main thrill slides. The Wedgie is a body slide featuring a trap-door release into a near-vertical  drop. Riders then enter a fast, downward-spiralling turn and reach speeds of nearly  before they are slowed in a run-out chute. The ride was the first ProSlide SuperLOOP in the world. Within the funnel, riders oscillate back and forth up the walls at the side and drop into a splash pool. From its opening to 2015, The Green Room has been Australia's largest ProSlide Tornado beating Wet'n'Wild Gold Coast's Tornado in height and tunnel length. On the Super Tubes Hydrocoaster, three people sit on a  raft, whose weight is mainly attributable to a large magnet on its underside. Riders experience several steep drops followed by magnet-powered inclines, ending with a splashdown in a small pool. The Super Tubes Hydrocoaster was the second ProSlide Hydro Magnetic Rocket Slide in the world and continues to be Australia's only water coaster.

The second slide tower, along the park's southern border, features two rides with more moderate thrill ratings. On The Rip, riders hop into a four-person, cloverleaf-shaped tube. They descend a dark tunnel before entering a large, open bowl. The raft circles the centre of the bowl then exits down through the centre and into a splashdown pool. The Rip was the first ProSlide Behemoth Bowl in Australia. The BRO has a capacity of 1000 riders per hour. When The BRO opened in 2006, it was the largest ProSlide Octopus Racer in the world and is the only one in Australia. A third slide, Triple Vortex, was added to the tower in late 2014. Pairs of riders will slide down an enclosed tube slide with three funnels, similar to miniature versions of the park's Green Room funnel.

The slide tower in the southeast corner of the park contains five slides designed for those who desire a mild thrill. Some of the slides on this tower interact with Dreamworld's The Gold Coaster roller coaster. The Little Rippers are two ProSlide duelling cannon bowl slides. The slides can accommodate guests riding in either one or two person tubes. Riders begin in one of two parallel chutes before entering tunnels and splitting off in opposite directions. Each tunnel has a steep drop into the bowl element of the ride, after which the raft drops down through the centre and into a run-out chute. The other three slides on this tower are collectively known as The Temple of Huey. Guests can ride in a single or double tube. All three slides are ProSlide Pipelines. Broken Headz and Cut Snake are enclosed and Screamin Right Handers is an open flume.

A fourth slide tower opened in 2019, featuring the six body slides that form the Fully 6 attraction.

Three family-oriented attractions are located on the ground level, detached from the three slide towers. Two of these are children's areas and the third is a wave pool. Pipeline Plunge is a children's area with four flume slides and hundreds of water activities. The area, originally called Nickelodeon's Pipeline Plunge, is a large, multi-level water play structure featuring an  tipping bucket which dumps water on guests every few minutes. It played host to two "Slime Fest" events in 2009 that included several live shows, a dunking chair and "Australia's biggest sliming" where  of slime was dumped on park guests using green coloured water in the giant tipping bucket twice daily. The mass sliming returned in the 2010/2011 summer holidays as part of the Summer Funomenon. Pipeline Plunge is a WhiteWater West Aqua Play area. Wiggle Bay is a Wiggles themed toddler area featuring musical and interactive water play activities, a shallow pool and four Wiggles-coloured water slides, located at the back of the area. these were manufactured by ProSlide. The interactive features are manufactured by WaterPlay. Built by Murphy's Waves of Scotland, the pool has a constant temperature of 26 degrees Celsius. The Get Wet Surf School makes use of the pool for its lessons outside of normal park operating hours.

List of Attractions

Other facilities

In addition to its lineup of attractions, WhiteWater World also has a retail outlet, an events venue, cabanas, and several food and beverage outlets.

The Beyond the Beach shop, located near the park's entrance, sells surf and WhiteWater World branded merchandise. The shop contains a Kodak photo centre that allows guests to purchase on-ride photos taken on the Super Tubes Hydrocoaster and photographs taken inside the park. Beyond the Beach also serves as the exit gates for the park.

WhiteWater World operates two dining outlets in the peak holiday seasons: Bite Me Cafe and Salty's Kiosk. The widest range of meals is available from the Bite Me Cafe which operates all year round. Salty's Kiosk is located next to The BRO and sells slushies, ice creams and other snack foods. The park also operated the Sandman's Cafe and Bar, which was a licensed bar where guests can purchase alcoholic drinks and food options including Eagle Boys pizza. It is located on the park's western border between the Cave of Waves and the splashdown of The Wedgie.

Since September 2007, WhiteWater World has hosted an undercover events venue, the largest at an Australian theme park, The Shell. The venue can cater for up to 2000 guests and is located on the southeast corner of WhiteWater World.

From April 2011, WhiteWater World has offered guests the hire of 12 luxury cabanas, located around the park. Each cabana is designed for up to four guests, who have access to deck chairs, couches, a coffee table, an iPod dock, towels and a mini refrigerator.

Reception

Prior to opening, WhiteWater World was criticised for being built during one of Australia's worst droughts and in an area on Level 5 water restrictions. When designing WhiteWater World, Macquarie Leisure implemented measures to ensure that the park was one of the most water efficient water parks in the world through the minimisation of water loss.

In October 2008, staff at WhiteWater World stopped Paralympian Steve Simmonds from riding the slides. Simmonds was angry and stated that he felt like he was discriminated against. WhiteWater World cited manufacturer guidelines and safety concerns as the reasons behind the restrictions.

During the first full year of operation, WhiteWater World attracted more visitors than the expected 450,000 guests. Attendance records show close to 500,000 guests attended the park during that period.

In a review of several Australian entertainment attractions for The Australian, Scott Podmore rated WhiteWater World 7.5 out of 10, outranking its main competitors Wet'n'Wild Gold Coast and Sea World also on the Gold Coast and UnderWater World on the Sunshine Coast. Podmore stated that "WhiteWater World is a wonderful, diverse park offering something for everyone." and that "WhiteWater World is fantastic for a splash, some R&R or some slippery big rides". Podmore highlighted The Rip, The BRO, Little Rippers and Temple of Huey as the park's top attractions.

Before The Wedgie opened in April 2010, several media reporters experienced the ride. Tanya Westthorp of the Gold Coast Bulletin described the ride as "...not for the faint-hearted". She also stated that "...disorientation prevails for a large chunk of the ride, but the thrill is unparalleled to any other waterslide". Phil Lutton of the Brisbane Times wrote that the ride "...is not only the fastest, most exhilarating water ride I've ever tried but it lives up to its name in spades".

See also

Dreamworld
Dreamworld Wildlife Foundation
SkyPoint Observation Deck

References

External links
 
 

2006 establishments in Australia
Ardent Leisure
Buildings and structures on the Gold Coast, Queensland
Water parks in Queensland
Tourist attractions on the Gold Coast, Queensland
 WhiteWater World